Maa Kheru is a phrase meaning "true of voice" or "justified" or "the acclaim given to him is 'right'". The term is involved in ancient Egyptian afterlife beliefs, according to which deceased souls had to be judged morally righteous. Once the soul had passed the test, the Weighing of the Heart, they were judged to be mꜣꜥ ḫrw and was allowed to enter the afterlife. The phrase was often used to denote someone who had passed and become a god by placing it at the end of the name of the individual in question. As such, it is frequently found in inscriptions in Egyptian tombs and royal mortuary temples, especially as part of an introductory clause for autobiographical inscriptions celebrating the tomb or temple owner's achievements in life.

See also
 Maat, the Egyptian concept of truth, order, and justice (from the same root)

References

Ancient Egyptian religion
 Book of the Dead
 Egyptian words and phrases
Ancient Egyptian titles